Joseph A. Smith Jr is the current editor-in-chief of the Journal of Urology and William L. Bray Professor in the Department of Urologic Surgery at Vanderbilt University in Nashville, Tennessee. He was the chair of the Department of Urology from 1991 to 2015. He has served as the President of American Board of Urology (2004–05) Southeastern Section, American Urologic Association and the Utah Urologic Society (1981–83).

Early life
Smith completed his MD training at the University of Tennessee, Memphis, Tennessee, in 1974. Later, he underwent his surgical residency at the Parkland Memorial Hospital, University of Texas, Southwestern Medical School. In 1979, he completed his urology residency at University of Utah, Salt Lake City, Utah.

References

Year of birth missing (living people)
Living people
American editors
American urologists
University of Tennessee alumni
University of Utah alumni
Vanderbilt University faculty